Flux is the fourth studio album by American singer Poppy. It was released on September 24, 2021, through Sumerian Records. The album was produced by Justin Meldal-Johnsen and features a more organic sound in comparison to her previous album, I Disagree. The album received positive reviews.

Background and release
During an interview with Spin, Poppy said that she wanted the songwriting to be the focal point of the album as opposed to "the rollercoaster of emotions that I Disagree was." The album was produced by Justin Meldal-Johnsen who has previously worked with Paramore, M83, St. Vincent. On June 30, 2021, Poppy released the lead single for the new album titled, "Her". The title track was released as the second single for the album. On August 25, 2021, Poppy released the third single from the album titled "So Mean" and released it with an accompanying music video. The album was released on September 24, 2021.

Composition
Flux has been described as alternative rock, grunge, pop-punk, dream pop, shoegaze, and punk rock. AllMusic and Flood Magazine both called the album a rock record." Flood Magazine also called the album grunge-pop. According to Clash, "Flux sees Poppy continue to embrace her love of punk, rock and heavy metal but still keeps that day-dreaming pop element to it that some of her previous works have." According to Spin, the album "[draws] on stoner-metal ('Lessen the Damage'), pop-punk ('So Mean'), new wave ('Hysteria') and shoegaze-y dream-pop ('As Strange as It Seems') in satisfying bursts." The title track utilizes some electronic elements. The album marks a departure from the metal sound of her previous album and is considered to be less aggressive. However, the album still features some screaming from Poppy. The album also features a more organic sound in comparison to her previous album. According to Poppy during an interview with Spin, "for all of us to be in the room together, Justin wanted to make a live record. And he mentioned at the very beginning of it — his exact words were, 'I've never been this little prepared to start an album', which made me very excited." To make the album sound more organic, Poppy and her band recorded it together live to tape.

Critical reception

Flux received critical acclaim. At Metacritic, which assigns a normalized rating out of 100 to reviews from mainstream critics, the album has an average score of 80 out of 100, based on eight reviews. 

Neil Z. Yeung of AllMusic considered the album to be a "step forward for Poppy's songwriting" and called the album "[her most] authentic and earnest work." Writing for Beats Per Minute, John Wohlmacher stated "Flux is the most direct and unfiltered of Pereira's projects so far. Where her...pop records have explored viral aspects of cultural cosplay, and I Disagree saw her playfully weave medleys that presented nu-metal crossovers with Japanese city pop and 60s psychedelia...Flux manages to highlight to the forgotten influence women had on rock and pop in the 90s..." Shannon Garner of Clash praised the album's musical content and throwback to old sounds stating it is "a scintillating blend of 90s alt-rock and daring 2k21 elements". Emma Swann of DIY praised the album and called it "a great rock album." 

Writing for Exclaim!, Rhys Juergensen stated, "[Poppy's] constant need for change — for flux — is, ironically, the very thing that gives her consistency. With this album, Poppy very clearly says that her new niche is to not have a niche. Rhian Daly of The Forty-Five was positive towards the album and stated, "with sonic sugar rushes and eardrum assaults, Poppy's fourth album is the sound of her finding her feet through a big creative shift." Kerrang!s James Hickie stated that "Poppy triumphs on her deepest and most artistic album to date, Flux". Red Dziri of The Line of Best Fit stated, "her latest album proves that there's simply no boxing her in – despite all the attempts by previous collaborators to keep her contained." 

Writing for NME, El Hunt described the album as "determined, fun-filled and perception-defying alt-rock". Brad Sanders writing for Pitchfork stated, "Poppy’s albums have increasingly offered revealing glimpses of the woman behind the mask. Flux is her most unguarded work yet, and it's the closest we've come yet to meeting the real Poppy." Paul Brown of Wall of Sound stated, "[this album proves] Poppy has well and truly earned her spot amongst the greats of the alternative scene."

Year-end lists

Track listing 
All tracks are produced by Justin Meldal-Johnsen.

Charts

Release history

References

2021 albums
Poppy (entertainer) albums
Sumerian Records albums
Nu metal albums by American artists
Industrial albums by American artists
Hard rock albums by American artists
Heavy metal albums by American artists
Glam metal albums
Albums produced by Justin Meldal-Johnsen